Nazeer Abbasi (Sindhi:نذير عباسى, Urdu:نذیر عباسی) (b. April 10, 1953 — d. August 9, 1980) was the youngest member of the Central Committee of the Communist Party of Pakistan. He was tortured to death on August 9, 1980 in government of Muhammad Zia-ul-Haq
while in the custody of FIU Field Intelligence Unit of Pakistan Army. His family has accused former ISI operative Brigadier Imtiaz Ahmed Billa of torturing and killing Abbasi while in his custody, and Billa has admitted this in a TV interview.

Early life
Abbasi was born to Jan Muhammad Abbasi and Qamar-ul-Nisa in Tando Allahyar, Sindh, Pakistan on April 10, 1953. After completing his intermediate education, he Started working at Municipal Committee Tando Allahyar and Organized a Union of Municipal Workers. He went on to study at the Sindh University where he got B.Sc. in Political science. He married Hameeda Ghanghro on 4 February 1978 and had a daughter, Zarqa Abbasi.

Political career
He started politics during student life. He was first arrested as a member of Azad Marorra Students Federation in 1969, which was demanding the publication of the electoral voter lists in Sindhi language. In prison he met communists and leaders of National Students Federation. In jail he was influenced by fellow political prisoners belonging to Sindh National Students Federation, an organization which he joined, and later became leader of. Abbasi was arrested again in May 1978 by military during the dictatorship of Zia-ul-Haq charged with publication of clandestine monthly Halchal and was sent to notorious prison Quli Camp Quetta. During that period many of the members of Sindh National Students Federation and Sindh Hari Committee were arrested from all over Sindh.
He was arrested again by the FIU Field Intelligence Unit of Pakistan Army's Brigadier Billa from Karachi on July 30, 1980, along with Professor Jamal Naqvi, Amarlal, Kamal Warsi and Shabbir Shar, who were later joined by Sohail Sangi, Badar Abro and others. Abbasi was arrested on 30 July 1980 with other party workers. He was killed while the rest of the group were tried in a military court in what came to be known as the Jam Saqi case.

Death
Nazeer Abbasi was tortured to death on August 9, 1980.

References

External links 
 Leftists want arrest of leader’s killers, Dawn, 8 August 2009
 Demand to reopen Abbasi murder case, Dawn, 10 August 2009
 Nazir Abbasi – A legendary Hero of Sindh, Indus Asia Online Journal, 1 August 2009
 Biography of Nazeer Abbasi by Hassan Mujtaba

Sindhi people
Communist Party of Pakistan politicians
1980 deaths
1953 births
University of Sindh alumni